Siculus (from Greek) was a legendary king and son of Italus.

Thucydides and other Greek historians have suggested that he was the legendary progenitor of the Sicels (or Siculi), an Italic people who colonised Sicily three hundred years before the Ancient Greeks in 1050 BCE. The island was originally called Sicania after a previous legendary King called Sicanus.

References

Kings in Roman mythology
Legendary progenitors
Kings in Greek mythology